Toxic Legacy is a Canadian documentary film that was produced by Susan Teskey for the Canadian Broadcasting Corporation. It was broadcast on the CBC and Discovery Times on September 5, 2006. The film deals with the toxic legacy of the Ground Zero dust following the September 11 attacks in 2001 upon the World Trade Center.

It addresses the U.S. government's minimization of local health risks in the vicinity of Ground Zero site of the World Trade Center. It also addressed the praise of the first responders and the deleterious health effects thousands of these workers have experienced since their cleanup of the World Trade Center site.

9/11 Toxic Legacy won the 2007 Canada Golden Sheaf Award for Best Documentary in Science and Medicine.

See also
Casualties of the September 11 attacks

References

External links

2006 in the environment
Canadian documentary television films
Documentary films about the September 11 attacks
2000s Canadian films